Justin Ndikumana (born 1 March 1993) is a Burundian football goalkeeper who plays for Bandari. He was a squad member at the 2019 Africa Cup of Nations.

References

1993 births
Living people
Burundian footballers
Burundi international footballers
Prince Louis FC players
Vital'O F.C. players
FC Saint-Éloi Lupopo players
Sofapaka F.C. players
Bandari F.C. (Kenya) players
Association football goalkeepers
Burundian expatriate footballers
Expatriate footballers in Kenya
Burundian expatriate sportspeople in Kenya
2019 Africa Cup of Nations players